The Frank G. Zarb School of Business, located at Hofstra University in Hempstead, NY, is noted for its dual AACSB accreditations in business and accounting. The school is named after alumnus Frank Zarb, '57 B.B.A., '62 M.B.A., who was the chair and CEO of the National Association of Securities Dealers (NASD) and a senior partner of Lazard Freres & Co. The current dean of the business school is Dr. Janet A. Lenaghan.

Degrees
The school offers Bachelor of Business Administration, Master of Business Administration, Master of Science degrees, the Executive Master of Business Administration (E.M.B.A.) degree, as well as minors in business subjects and certificate programs. In 2011, the school launched the first online MBA program on Long Island, NY. Hofstra also offers an MBA program with classes held in Manhattan.

Rankings
The Zarb School of Business is nationally ranked as one of the nation's top business schools according to U.S. News & World Report and The Princeton Review.
Additionally, it has been noted in Arco Book's The Best Graduate Schools as being ranked Outstanding, on the continuum, Distinguished, Outstanding, Recommended

The Princeton Review identified the Zarb School MBA in marketing among the top 15 programs out of at any college or university based on their Student Opinion Honors for Business Schools.

Bloomberg Businessweek ranked the Zarb School undergraduate business program 97 out of approximately 1,600 business school programs in the country.

U.S. News & World Report (2012), ranked the Zarb School of Business 105th (out of 426 graduate business programs) in the U.S. News & World Report annual ranking of full-time master's programs in business. In 2017 U.S. News & World Report ranked Hofstra's part-time MBA program #89 and its online MBA program #36. The online MBA program was also ranked #15 in the nation by Forbes.   However, for 2023, U.S. News & World Report has Zarb MBA as Unranked.

Facilities
During the summer, the School of Business offers Hofstra students the opportunity to study at Erasmus University in Rotterdam, The Netherlands, and at Hong-Ik University in Seoul, South Korea. The business school also has a chapter of Beta Gamma Sigma. In January 2005, the Zarb School took a major step toward establishing a trading room, named after alumni member Martin B. Greenberg, by installing 34 Bloomberg terminals. One of the newest structures on Hofstra's campus, is the C.V. Starr Hall. It is named for philanthropist Cornelius Vander Starr.

Centers and special institutes
Business students can also participate in scholarly activities like The Merrill Lynch Center. This center was enacted to promote and facilitate faculty and student study in the field of international financial services and markets, and to communicate knowledge and information in this field. The Center will seek to accomplish this through (a) the interaction of academics and professionals; and (b) an interdisciplinary approach to the study of the Center's areas of interest. Other events include the Frank G. Zarb School of Business Executive Speaker Series where numerous business professionals from various, diverse fields are invited to the school to lecture, take part in a question and answer session and share their knowledge/experiences in their area of expertise.

Student organizations
Student organizations include the Journal of International Business & Law, which is a joint scholarly publication of the Frank G. Zarb School of Business and the students of the Hofstra University School of Law. The Hofstra Business Consulting Group, which has grown to become a powerful source of strategic consulting for growing businesses in the New York metropolitan area and the Hofstra American Marketing Association. The Hofstra Marketing Association is a member of the American Marketing Association and provides its members with opportunities to improve their skills, interact with professionals from local businesses, and keep informed of the latest marketing trends.

Alumni opportunities
Zarb Business school alumni can participate in The New York Business Schools Club (NYBSC), which was founded in 1990 (and now comprises over 30 leading business schools). The goal of the club is to provide a forum for members to share programming, collaborate on events together and share best practices on events and club administration. Numerous events are held throughout the year (Bi-monthly meetings held in mid-town NY, end of the year cocktail party, the All MBA soiree – an annual holiday party open to the members of all alumni clubs who participate in the NYBSC, and yearly party over the world.). Zarb alumni members are encouraged to join so they can meet and greet other alumni from various business schools.

References

External links

Hofstra University
Business schools in New York (state)
Universities and colleges on Long Island
Universities and colleges in New York City